Ricardo Andrés Aparicio (born August 10, 1976) is a Uruguayan footballer who played as a midfielder for clubs in Colombia, Guatemala and Argentina as well as his native country.

External links
 Profile at BDFA 
 
 Profile at Tenfield Digital 

1976 births
Living people
Uruguayan footballers
Uruguayan expatriate footballers
Liverpool F.C. (Montevideo) players
Montevideo Wanderers F.C. players
Club Nacional de Football players
Defensor Sporting players
Sportivo Cerrito players
C.A. Bella Vista players
El Tanque Sisley players
Rampla Juniors players
Cerro Largo F.C. players
Quilmes Atlético Club footballers
Club Atlético Banfield footballers
Defensores de Belgrano footballers
San Martín de Tucumán footballers
Atlético Junior footballers
C.S.D. Municipal players
Uruguayan Primera División players
Argentine Primera División players
Categoría Primera A players
Expatriate footballers in Argentina
Expatriate footballers in Colombia
Expatriate footballers in Guatemala

Association football midfielders